Dwayne Hill (born June 5, 1966) is a Canadian voice actor. In 2009, he was nominated for two Gemini awards, one in the solo category for Grossology, the other, which he won, was for best ensemble in Atomic Betty. Overall, he has voiced over 20 animated series, playing hundreds of voices as well as voicing over 100 commercials each year. One of his most recent roles is Cat in the PBS animated series Peg + Cat which was nominated for an Emmy Award among the best performances in animated series.

Career
His biggest on-camera roles include playing Coach Carr in Mean Girls, The Safety of Objects which premiered at the 2001 Toronto International Film Festival, and The Truth About the Head, which won 3 awards at the 2003 Cannes film festival including the Kodak short film award. Dwayne has appeared in over 100 commercials, including the Bud Light spot "Mr. Silent Killer Gas Passer" for the Real Men of Genius campaign, which won a Gold Clio in Cannes. From 1997-2003, Hill played "Mr. Voiceman", the off-camera announcer on the YTV game show Uh Oh!.

Roles
Peg + Cat - Cat
Grojband - Buzz Newsworthy/Metrognome/Torbo/Gary
Babar and the Adventures of Badou - Heropotamus
Scaredy Squirrel - Hatton
Jimmy Two-Shoes - Samy
Yin Yang Yo! - Dave
Pandalian - Abby and Gold
Skatoony - Hoo the Gorillia/Colonel Zeppo
Atomic Betty - Minimus P.U./B-1/Spindly Tam Kanushu/Roger/Dodger
Franny's Feet - Joey the Canadian Dig Boy
Jacob Two-Two - Principal I.M. Greedyguts
Seven Little Monsters - Three
Marvin the Tap-Dancing Horse - Fast-Talking Jack
Maggie and the Ferocious Beast - Nedley
The Dumb Bunnies - Bill Uppity
Braceface  Dr. Hertz
Total Drama Action/Total DramaRama - Josh
Stoked - Buster
 Moville Mysteries - Coach Conkout
Willa's Wild Life - Inky the Penguin/Burt the Bear/Wallace the Walrus/Lou the Elephant/Dr. Fector/Mr. Tremble
The Nut Job 2: Nutty by Nature - Police Officer/Additional Voices
Norman Picklestripes - Norm
Mean Girls - Coach Carr

References

External links
 
 http://www.metacafe.com/watch/746658/mr_silent_killer_gas_passer
 

1966 births
Living people
Canadian male video game actors
Canadian male voice actors
Game show announcers
People from Mississauga
21st-century Canadian male actors
20th-century Canadian male actors
Canadian male television actors
Canadian male film actors